Huaichuan Subdistrict is an urban subdistrict in Liuyang City, Hunan Province, People's Republic of China.

Administrative division
The subdistrict is divided into eight communities, the following areas: 
 Chengxijie Community
 Xizhengjie Community
 Chaoyangjie Community
 Beizhengjie Community
 Xinbei Community
 Beiyuan Community
 Chengdong Community
 Liancheng Community

Geography

Liuyang River, also known as the mother river, flows through the subdistrict.

Economy
The economy is supported primarily by commerce and tourism.

Education
There are three primary schools, one middle school and one high school: Renmin Road School, Liuyang River School and Xianghuai School, Liuyang River Middle School, and Liuyang No. 1 High School.

Hospital
 Liuyang Municipal Renmin Hospital

Transportation

National Highway
The subdistrict is connected to two national highways: G106 and G319.

Provincial Highway
The Provincial Highway S309 runs through the subdistrict.

Religion
The Liuyang Confucius Temple and the Ancestral Hall of Tan Sitong are famous tourist attractions.

Wenjin Temple is a Buddhist temple in the subdistrict.

Yaowang Shengchong Palace is a Taoist temple in the subdistrict.

Attractions
Simiao Park, Cuiyuan Park and Martyrs Park are public and urban park in the subdistrict.

The main attractions are the Former Residence of Ouyang Yuqian, Former Residence of Tan Sitong, Kuiwen Pavilion and Chenghuang Temple.

Gallery

References

Divisions of Liuyang
Liuyang